The Republic of Poland Ambassador to Sweden (Swedish: Polen ambassadör i Sverige) serves as the official diplomatic representative of the President and the Government of Poland to the King and the Government of the Kingdom of Sweden.

As with all Poland Ambassadors, the ambassador to Denmark is nominated by the President of Poland and confirmed by the Parliamentary Commission of the Foreign Affairs. The ambassador serves at the pleasure of the President, and enjoys full diplomatic immunity.

Poland Embassy in Sweden is located in Stockholm.

List of ambassadors of Poland to Sweden

Second Polish Republic 

 1919-1924: Jan Zygmunt Michałowski (envoy)
 1924-1928: Alfred Wysocki (envoy)
 1928-1934: Konstanty Rozwadowski (envoy)
 1934-1936: Antoni Roman (envoy)
 1936-1942: Gustaw Potworowski (envoy)
 1942-1945: Henryk Sokolnicki (chargé d'affaires)

People's Polish Republic 

 1945-1948: Adam Ostrowski
 1948-1950: Czesław Bobrowski
 1950-1954: Eugeniusz Milnikiel (envoy)
 1953-1957: Józef Koszutski
 1957-1964: Antoni Szymanowski
 1965-1969: Michał Kajzer
 1969-1972: Stanisław Bejm
 1972-1978: Stanisław Staniszewski
 1978-1983: Paweł Cieślar
 1983-1987: Maria Regent-Lechowicz
 1987-1991: Sławomir Dąbrowa
 1991-1997: Barbara Tuge-Erecińska
 1997-2001: Ryszard Czarny
 2001-2005: Marek Prawda
 2005-2010: Michał Czyż
 2010-2014: Adam Hałaciński
 2014-2018: Wiesław Tarka
 2018-2020: Iwona Jabłonkowska (chargé d'affaires a.i.)
 since 2020: Joanna Hofman

References 

 
Sweden
Poland